Orthodontopsis bardunovii is a species of moss in the family Orthodontiaceae. It is endemic to Russia, where it is known only from the Altai and Sayan Mountains. It grows on rotting logs in forested habitat and it is threatened by deforestation.

References

Rhizogoniales
Endemic flora of Russia
Endangered plants
Taxonomy articles created by Polbot